Shangguan is the atonal pinyin romanization of various Chinese words and names, and may refer to:

 Shangguan (surname), a Chinese compound surname
  (上馆镇, Shǎngguǎnzhèn), a town in Shanxi, China